The Toufic H. Kalil House is a house museum in the North End neighborhood of Manchester, New Hampshire, designed by Frank Lloyd Wright in 1955. The Usonian Automatic design of this house allowed Wright to meet the requirements of Dr. Toufic and Mildred Kalil, a Lebanese professional couple. Wright used the term Usonian Automatic to describe the design of economical Usonian style houses constructed of modular concrete blocks. This house illustrates Wright's creative use of this inexpensive material.

Typical of Wright's Usonian style, the Kalil house draws its beauty from simple, linear forms rather than ornamental details. Symmetrical rows of rectangular window openings give the heavy concrete a sense of airiness.

The Kalil house was designed in the mid-1950s, near the end of Wright's life. The Zimmerman House was built in a very different Usonian style for Dr. Toufic Kalil's good friend and hospital colleague, Dr. Zimmerman, three lots down, on the same street, five years earlier.

This  house contains a living room, kitchen, two bedrooms, two baths and a study. All of the original furniture, most of which is built-in, is still intact. 

In September 2019, it was reported that the house would be put up for sale in October, with an asking price of $850,000. The Currier Museum of Art, also in Manchester and very close by, subsequently acquired the house in November 2019, and began operating public tours there alongside the nearby Wright-designed Zimmerman House.

Sources
 Storrer, William Allin. The Frank Lloyd Wright Companion. University Of Chicago Press, 2006,  (S.387)

References

External links
 Website regarding the Kalil House from the Currier Museum of Art
 The Toufic Kalil Home by Frank Lloyd Wright - Photo Tour
 Boston.com feature
Union Leader article

Frank Lloyd Wright buildings
Houses in Manchester, New Hampshire
Houses completed in 1955
1955 establishments in New Hampshire
Modernist architecture in New Hampshire